Hydrogen diselenide is an inorganic selenium compound with a chemical formula  or . At room temperature, hydrogen diselenide dissociates easily to hydrogen selenide and elemental selenium, and is therefore not stable. However, hydrogen diselenide can be stable in some solutions.

References

Selenium compounds
Hydrogen compounds